Rugby union in Croatia is a minor sport.  , they are ranked fiftieth in the International Rugby Board's world rankings.

Governing body
The Croatian Rugby Union was founded in 1962 (as a domestic body), became a full national body in 1992 (after independence) and joined the IRB in 1994.

History

Rugby union in pre-independence Croatia was a moderately popular sport, but due to its recent international successes, it is gaining more recognition.

Yugoslav period

Some people date the start of Croatian rugby to 17 January 1954 when the Mladost team from Zagreb was formed to become Croatia's first rugby union club. Some years later, a XV from London Welsh RFC toured Zagreb, which may be seen as a sign of how things were to improve.

Croatian sides competed in the Rugby Championship of Yugoslavia, which ran from 1957-1991. Croatia was something of a centre of rugby union in Yugoslavia before it gained its independence.

Post-independence
The breakup of Yugoslavia meant that rugby was a low priority. However, it ironically had something of a minor revival in Croatia, when occupying British troops started to play regular games against the locals in the 1990s. By that point there were a thousand registered players in the country, and fourteen clubs, and some fifty Croats playing in the France's top three divisions.

In the early 1990s, former Italian cap, Dr Giancarlo Tizanini was a major driving force in Austrian rugby. Before his death in 1994, he tried hard to establish a Central European
equivalent of the Six Nations between Austria, Hungary, Croatia, 
Slovenia and Bosnia.

The biggest rugby "scrum" in the world was made on 14 Oct 2007, in Croatia, with over 200 players of all categories from Croatian rugby club Nada, for a Millennium Photo.

, more than half of the two thousand registered players are pre-teens or teenagers.  In addition, there are currently twenty-three domestic clubs that compete against each other on various levels.

Women's rugby
Although Croatia's women have not yet played test match rugby, they have been playing international sevens rugby since 2003. (Current playing record).

National team

The national team has been competing since the early 1990s.  As of April 2009, the national team is currently competing in the European Nations Cup and is attempting to qualify for the 2011 Rugby World Cup.

Croatia have a host of players who are New Zealanders, Australians and South Africans of Croatian origin who play the game and have played internationally for these countries.

Frano Botica was a one time Croatian rugby coach and former All Black, whose grandparents were born in Korčula. Another former All Black who turned out for the Croatian side at the same time was Matthew Cooper. Dan Luger is an England representative whose father Darko Luger is from the island of Brac. Sean Fitzpatrick is another former All Black captain who has Croatian heritage. Also they have recently appointed a new coach named Milan Yelavich, he has a Croatian heritage but lives in New Zealand.  He has coached the North Harbour Rugby team and has been associated with many other Rugby teams in  New Zealand.

Domestic competition

Local Teams

There are 22 men's teams and 1 women's team. Teams are located in the major cities.

Currently members of the Croatian Rugby Federation are the following teams (and cities in brackets)

 RK Knin (Knin)
 Pula (Pula)
 Invictus Dubrovnik (Dubrovnik)
 Kastelanska Rivijera (Kaštela)
 Lokomotiva (Zagreb)
 Makarska Rivijera (Makarska)
 HARK (Hrvatski Akademski Ragbi Klub) Mladost (Zagreb)
 Nada (Split)
 Ploce (Ploče)
 Ragbi '59 (Split)
 Rijeka (Rijeka)
 Rudes (Zagreb)
 Sinj Dalmacija (Sinj)
 RK Sisak (Sisak)
 Šibenik (Šibenik)
 RK Zadar (Zadar)
 RK Zagreb (rugby union) (Zagreb)
 Zagreb Veteranski RK (Zagreb)
 Zrinski (Zagreb)
 Atletiko Filipjakov (Sv. Filip i Jakov) 
 Novi Zagreb Rugby
The woman's club is called Viktorija Zagreb.

Interliga Competition and Regional Rugby Championship
The Interliga involved club teams from Croatia, Slovenia and previously Bosnia-Herzegovina.

In 2004/05, 9 teams participated (Croatia: RK Nada Split, RK Zagreb, HARK Mladost, Makarska Rivijera and RK Sisak - Slovenia: RK Ljubljana, Bežigrad and Emona - Bosnia: RK Čelik) with Ljubljana finishing first.

In 2005/06, 5 teams entered with Croatia's Zagreb winning the competition.

In 2006/07, 6 teams entered and Nada became competition winners for the first time.

Also in season 2007/08 onward, a Regional Rugby Championship was set up with teams from Croatia, Hungary, Slovenia, Bosnia-Herzegovina and Serbia and others.

See also
Croatia national rugby union team
Rugby union in Yugoslavia (pre-1992)

References
 Bath, Richard (ed.) The Complete Book of Rugby (Seven Oaks Ltd, 1997 )

External links
Official Website of the Croatian Rugby Union
 Archives du Rugby: Croatie

Club Pages
 HARK Mladost
 Nada Split
 Makarska Rivijera
 Zagreb
 Ploce
 RK Sinj
 Tomislavgrad
 RK Knin
 - Vilani Krasica 
 - RK Brač
 - Sv. Filip i Jakov
 RK Lokomotiva